Cape Spear is a headland located on the Avalon Peninsula of Newfoundland near St. John's in the Canadian province of Newfoundland and Labrador. At a longitude of 52°37'W, it is the easternmost point in Canada and North America, excluding Greenland.

The Portuguese named this location , meaning "cape of hope", which became  in French and finally "Cape Spear".

Cape Spear is the trailhead/trail end for two components of the East Coast Trail.

History
The Cape Spear region was originally inhabited by Beothuk peoples. Additionally, Mi'kmaq communities practiced a non-sedentary presence in the area, harvesting subsistence resources on a temporary basis prior to permanent residency at settlements such as St. George's Bay and Conne River from the nineteenth century onwards. In contrast to European settlers who viewed the cape as a place of significance as the easternmost point in Canada, there is no known archaeological evidence to indicate that Cape Spear was viewed by local Indigenous communities as a place of symbolic geographical importance. According to Fife and Roseman, historically there are "no indications that either the Beothuk or the Mi'kmaq equated Cape Spear with a 'land's end' that was meaningful to them."

World War II

Because of its proximity to convoy routes during the Second World War, a Canadian-manned gun battery including two Lend-Lease ex-US 10-inch M1888 guns on disappearing carriages was installed at Cape Spear to defend the entrance to St. John's harbor. Barracks and underground passages leading to the bunkers were built for the use of troops stationed there. The gun barrels remain in place. The bunkers and gun barrels that are located at the site afford a sheltered view of the ocean.

Lighthouses
A lighthouse has operated at Cape Spear since September 1836. The original Cape Spear lighthouse was the second lighthouse built in Newfoundland; the first was built in 1810 at Fort Amherst, at the entrance to St. John's Harbour. In 1832, the first legislative assembly for the colony created a lighthouse board. Cape Spear was chosen as the site for a new lighthouse because it was on the rocky eastern coast near the entrance to St. John's harbor.

Nicholas Croke and William Parker, two St. John's builders, won the contract for the lighthouse and work began in 1834 or early in 1835. The first lighthouse was a square wooden building with a tower in the middle containing the light. A foghorn was added in 1878. The first light used at Cape Spear had already been used since 1815 at a lighthouse on Inchkeith on the east coast of Scotland. The original light used seven Argand burners and curved reflectors. This was later replaced by a dioptric lens system; the light was first lit by oil, then acetylene, and finally electricity in 1930.

A new concrete lighthouse was built in 1955, and the original light was moved to the new building.

Lightkeepers
In 1835, dense fog enveloped an approaching warship carrying a VIP visitor to St. John's. The Governor sent out several pilot boats, and a young harbour pilot names James Cantwell succeeded in locating the ship and guiding it safely into harbour. Asked what reward he would like, he requested the job of keeper at the Cape Spear lighthouse, then under construction. It had been promised to another man, Emmanuel Warre, but when Warre died ten years later Cantwell became the second keeper. He served for 35 years; his son Dennis, who had been his assistant, later took over and, with two intermissions, the Cantwell family kept the Cape Spear light for over 150 years.

National Historic Site
The original Cape Spear lighthouse is the oldest surviving lighthouse in Newfoundland and the location has been designated a National Historic Site of Canada. The original lighthouse building and the lightkeeper's residence have been restored to the period of 1839, and are open to the public. The visitor centre includes a gift shop. The lighthouse was designated under the federal Heritage Lighthouse Protection Act in June 2016.

Some visitors attracted by the scenery and history have been swept away by the large and unpredictable waves at Cape Spear, prompting Parks Canada to post numerous warning signs in the area.

See also
 Cape St. Charles, the easternmost point of mainland North America
 List of lighthouses in Newfoundland and Labrador
 Heritage Lighthouse Protection Act

Further reading 
Environment Canada – Parks, Cape Spear National Historic Park brochure, 1986.

References

External links

 Parks Canada site 
 Aids to Navigation Canadian Coast Guard

Spear
National Historic Sites in Newfoundland and Labrador
Lighthouses on the National Historic Sites of Canada register
Coastal fortifications in Canada
Extreme points of Canada